The Last Assault (English: We, on the Front Lines) is a 1986 Romanian drama film directed by Sergiu Nicolaescu. It is set during World War II, during the period when Romania joined the Allies against the Axis.

Plot
Horia Lazăr (Alexandru) is an eager but inexperienced officer given a command of Romanian troops. His unit marches across Transylvania, Hungary, and Czechoslovakia, during which it suffers heavy casualties. Much of the second half of the film covers the Siege of Budapest, including German efforts to relieve it.

During the course of the war, Lazăr forms a relationship with Silvia (Onesa), the daughter of General Marinescu (played by Nicolaescu himself).

Production
In lieu of working German tanks, T-34's with German markings and some modifications were used instead. Some of the filming took place at the Văcărești Monastery during March 1985. Damage was committed during the filming, the worst being a fracturing of a marble cross given by Constantine Mavrocordatos, one of the monastery's founders.

Sergiu Nicolaescu wrote in his memoir that The Last Assault was the most censored of those films directed by him. The Leadership Council for Socialist Culture and Education forced the removal of a few key scenes: one involving violence committed by Hungarian soldiers; the removal of the Romanian Army from Budapest, on orders from Stalin, so that the Soviet Red Army could be the first to reach the Hungarian Parliament building; and the drama involving General Gheorghe Avramescu, who was accused by the Soviets of treason and was later executed (his daughter committed suicide while in detention).

One scene involves a pianist found by Romanian troops within a bombed out home in Budapest; Nicolaescu claimed this as a reference to the story of Władysław Szpilman (who was actually in Warsaw), which was later dramatized in Roman Polanski's The Pianist.

Reception
The film was successful upon release. Many commented that The Last Assault felt like an American film, which Nicolaescu took as a compliment. It was selected as the Romanian entry for the Best Foreign Language Film at the 59th Academy Awards, but was not accepted as a nominee.

Cast

 George Alexandru as Lt. Horia Lazăr
  as Silvia Marinescu
 Valentin Uritescu as Sgt. Saptefrati
 Ion Besoiu as Col. Câmpeanu
 Ștefan Iordache as Count colonel Hashkotty
 Sergiu Nicolaescu as General Marinescu
 Mircea Albulescu as Horia Lazăr's father
 Silviu Stănculescu as Soviet general
 Colea Răutu as Sgt. Pliushkin II
 Emil Hossu as soldier Munteanu, ex-political prisoner
 Vladimir Găitan as Soviet Lt. Igor Ivanich Bodnarenko
  as Cpl. Petre Mărgău, from Treznea
  as German General Reinhardt, commander of an armored division
  as German Maj. Franz
  as soldier Petcu
 Stelian Stancu as Major Badiu, commander of the infantry regiment
 Eusebiu Ștefănescu as German tank commander
  as soldier Firu
  as soldier Lică
  as German Lt. Peter Ungwart
  as Romanian corporal

See also
 List of submissions to the 59th Academy Awards for Best Foreign Language Film
 List of Romanian submissions for the Academy Award for Best Foreign Language Film

References

External links
 

1985 films
1985 drama films
Romanian drama films
1980s Romanian-language films
Eastern Front of World War II films
Films set in 1944
Films set in 1945
Films set in Romania
Films set in Hungary
Films directed by Sergiu Nicolaescu